The abbreviation LEAA may stand for:

 Law Enforcement Alliance of America
 Law Enforcement Assistance Administration
 The Lambert azimuthal equal-area projection of a sphere